Nyakim Gatwech (born January 27, 1993) is an Ethiopian-born American model of South Sudanese descent. She has attracted attention for her dark skin color and has achieved significant popularity on Instagram.

Biography
Nyakim Gatwech's parents lived in Maiwut, South Sudan, before they fled the Second Sudanese civil war to Gambela, Ethiopia where Nyakim was born. From there, they migrated to Kenya where they lived in refugee camps, until they finally migrated to the US, when she was 14 years old. Originally settling in Buffalo, New York, Nyakim later moved to Minneapolis, Minnesota. She has stated that, while she has never been to South Sudan, she considers herself South Sudanese. She considered a modeling career after taking part in a fashion show at St. Cloud State University. She has appeared in promotional posters for the 2017 film Jigsaw.

Social media
Gatwech is known for her naturally dark skin color and has been nicknamed the Queen of the Dark. Gatwech has faced self-esteem issues and comments from people who promote bleaching to lighten skin color. She has over 985,000 followers on Instagram.

See also
 Khoudia Diop

References

1993 births
Living people
South Sudanese emigrants to the United States
South Sudanese female models
People from Gambela Region